Vicente González (born 1904, date of death unknown) was an Argentine footballer. He played in two matches for the Argentina national football team in 1921. He was also part of Argentina's squad for the 1921 South American Championship.

References

External links
 

1904 births
Year of death missing
Argentine footballers
Argentina international footballers
Place of birth missing
Association football forwards
Gimnasia y Esgrima de Mendoza footballers
Independiente Rivadavia footballers
Club Atlético Independiente footballers
Ferro Carril Oeste footballers